Nogometni klub Svoboda Kisovec, commonly referred to as NK Svoboda Kisovec or simply Svoboda Kisovec, is a Slovenian football club which plays in the town of Kisovec. The club was founded in 1932.

References

External links
Official website 

Association football clubs established in 1932
Football clubs in Slovenia
1932 establishments in Yugoslavia